Holmes County State Park is a state park in the U.S. state of Mississippi located off U.S. Route 51 approximately  south of Durant. The park features two lakes,  English Lake and  Odum Lake.

History
Development of Holmes County State Park was begun in 1935 by the CCC, which constructed Mississippi's first nine state parks. The park is significant for its 1930s rustic style architecture, with buildings designed to integrate with the natural landscape. The construction of this and other state parks in Mississippi have been deemed an "excellent example of cooperative efforts between the state and federal government to help reduce the unemployment rates during the Great Depression."

Activities and amenities
The park offers 28 campsites built around two fishing lakes, a picnic area and shelters, and boat launch.

References

External links
Holmes County State Park Mississippi Department of Wildlife, Fisheries, and Parks

Protected areas of Holmes County, Mississippi
State parks of Mississippi
Historic districts on the National Register of Historic Places in Mississippi
National Register of Historic Places in Holmes County, Mississippi
Parks on the National Register of Historic Places in Mississippi